The Technological Educational Institute of Epirus (TEIEP; Greek: Τεχνολογικό Εκπαιδευτικό Ίδρυμα Ηπείρου) is a higher education public institute in Epirus, Greece, founded in 1994.

Its main campus and administrative centre is in Arta and departments are also located in Ioannina, Preveza and Igoumenitsa.

History 
The first Schools to operate, in the academic year 1994–95, was the School of Agricultural Technology and the School of Health and Welfare Professions. The Institute hosts today more than 10.000 students and it employs more than 100 members of academic and technical staff. The "ATHENA" Reform Plan restructured Higher Education programmes in 2013.

Schools and departments
The institute comprises five Schools, consisting of eight Departments.

Academic evaluation
In 2016 the external evaluation committee gave TEI of Epirus a Positive evaluation.

An external evaluation of all academic departments in Greek universities was conducted by the Hellenic Quality Assurance and Accreditation Agency (HQA).

See also
 List of universities in Greece
 University of Ioannina
 Ionian University
 List of research institutes in Greece
 Open access in Greece

References

External links 
 TEI of Epirus - Official Webpage 
 Hellenic Quality Assurance and Accreditation Agency (HQA) 
 TEIEP Quality Assurance Unit 
 Greek Research and Technology Network (GRNET) 
 Hellenic Academic Libraries Link (HEAL-Link) 

Technological educational institutions in Greece
1994 establishments in Greece
Educational institutions established in 1994
Epirus (region)